MOTM is the name of the modular synthesizer system manufactured by Synthesis Technology. MOTM stands for "Mother Of The Modulars".

History 

MOTM was created by Paul Schreiber in 1998. The system was created in part due to the renewed interest in large-format analog modular systems that occurred in the late 1990s. Production continues to this day, with over 8000 modules sold. The company, Synthesis Technology, also offers a limited number of modules in Eurorack
and Frac
format.

Specifications 
MOTM systems use a ±15 volt power supply for most modules, with an additional 5 volt power supply required for some digital modules. Audio signals are the standard 10 volts, peak to peak. The MOTM system modules are all "5U" high (1U being 1.75 inches), and multiples of 1U wide. All 5U MOTM modules use 1/4-inch jacks for audio/CV signals. Euro and Frac modules use 3.5mm" (~1/8") jacks. MOTM modules can be mounted in a standard 19" rack using MOTM 19A rack rails, although many users have custom cabinets made of metal or wood.

Euro and Frac modules 
In early 2006, Synthesis Technology released a limited number of Frac format modules, using 3.5mm jacks and a smaller overall form factor compatible with PAiA Electronics and Blacet modular systems. This was followed by the release of four Eurorack modules (also called 3U, compatible with systems from Doepfer and many other manufacturers).

Although full MOTM systems are only available in 5U format, the currently available Frac and Euro modules provide unique functionality that is somewhat different from the 5U MOTM modules. For example, in Frac format, the MOTM-1190 (Dual VCA) and MOTM-1800 (Looping ADSR) are similar but not identical in functionality to their 5U counterparts (the MOTM-190 and MOTM-800 respectively).

In Euro format, most of the currently available modules offer functionality that does not currently have an equivalent in MOTM 5U format. The E440 Discrete OTA VCF module is one exception, being very similar to the MOTM-440 (which is based on the SSM 2040 filter from the Sequential Circuits Prophet-5).

Modules 

The Modules are divided into categories, based on their function.
100 Series - VCA, Noise, etc.
MOTM-100 Noise Generator / Sample & Hold (replaced by MOTM-101)
MOTM-101 Noise Generator / Sample & Hold
MOTM-110 VCA / Ring Modulator (discontinued, replaced by MOTM-190)
MOTM-120 Sub Octave Multiplexer
MOTM-190 Micro VCA
300 Series - Oscillators
MOTM-300 Ultra VCO
MOTM-310 Micro VCO
MOTM-320 VC LFO
MOTM-380 Quad LFO
MOTM-390 Micro LFO
400 Series - Filters
MOTM-410 Triple Resonant VCF
MOTM-420 Korg MS-20 VCF
MOTM-440 Discrete OTA VCF
MOTM-450 Moog 907A Filter Bank (unreleased)
MOTM-480 Yamaha CS-80 VCF
MOTM-485 Yamaha GX-1 VCF
MOTM-490 Moog Transistor Ladder VCF
500 - Various 'Unusual' Modules
MOTM-510 Wavewarper (X*(Y/Z)^m analog function)
MOTM-520 Cloud Generator (unreleased)
600 - Digital Source/Utility
MOTM-600 MicroSequencer (unreleased)
MOTM-650 MIDI to CV converter
700 - Analog Logic modules
MOTM-700 VC Router
MOTM-730 VC Pulse Divider
800 - Utility modules
MOTM-800 ADSR Envelope Generator
MOTM-820 VC Lag Processor
MOTM-830 Dual-mode Mixer
MOTM-850 Pedal Interface
MOTM-890 Micro Mixer
900 - Power Supplies, Interconnects
MOTM-900 Dual Power Supply (+/- 15V)
MOTM-910 Cascade Multiple
MOTM-940 Patch Panel
MOTM-950 Triple Power Supply (+/- 15V and +5V)

References

External links 
 Synthesis Technologies, home of MOTM
 Review of MOTM system, Electronic Musician by Robert Rich, October 2011

Modular synthesizers